Apama, sometimes known as Apama I or Apame I, was a Sogdian noblewoman and the wife of the first ruler of the Seleucid Empire, Seleucus I Nicator. They married at Susa in 324 BC. According to Arrian, Apama was the daughter of the Sogdian baron Spitamenes. Apame was the only of the Susa wives to become queen as, unlike the other generals, Seleucus kept her after Alexander's death.

Apama had three children with her husband: Antiochus I Soter who inherited the Seleucid throne, Achaeus, and a daughter also called Apama.

Circa 300-297 BC, Seleucus married Stratonice, daughter of Demetrius I of Macedon, Seleucus had a daughter by Stratonice, who was called Phila. According to Malalas's chronicle, he married her after the death of Apama  but, according to other sources, she was still alive, as the people of Miletus honored her with a statue that year.

According to Appian (57–8), her husband named three cities Apamea after her. Modern scholars consider them to be Apamea on the Orontes River, Apamea in the Euphrates and Apamea in Media.

Notes 

4th-century BC women
4th-century BC Iranian people
Seleucid royal consorts
Sogdian people